Korfball was featured in the Summer Olympic Games demonstration programme in 1920 and 1928.

References

Olympics
Discontinued sports at the Summer Olympics
1920 Summer Olympics events
1928 Summer Olympics events
Olympic demonstration sports